Desmond Michael Connor (born 9 August 1935 in Ashgrove, QLD) is an Australian former rugby union halfback who represented internationally both the Australian and New Zealand national rugby union teams. He is an inductee in the Australian Rugby Union Hall of Fame.

Australian rugby career
After taking up the game at the Marist Brothers Ashgrove, Connor honed his skills further with the Brothers club. He made his representative debut for Queensland in 1954 and made further appearances for the state over the next five years. 

He was selected in Australian national squad for the Wallabies 1957–58 Australia rugby union tour of Britain, Ireland and France. Connor made his Australian test debut on 4 January 1958 against Wales and played in all five internationals on the Australian tour. Later that year he captained the Wallabies in Tests against the New Zealand Māori rugby union team, and then played against the All Blacks on a tour of New Zealand. 

At the start of the 1960s he left Australia to continue his teaching career in New Zealand, teaching at Takapuna Grammar.

New Zealand rugby career
Following his move to New Zealand he was capped 12 times by the All Blacks, with a record of 10 wins, a draw and a defeat. The defeat came in his final match in 1964, against Australia at Wellington.

Coaching
He was to return to Australian rugby as a coach firstly at Brisbane Brothers, then Queensland and Australia. He led the Wallabies in that role in their home series against New Zealand in 1968. A keen tactician and student of the game, Connor studied the rulebook and after consulting with referees, he introduced in the first Test the first short lineout used in the Southern Hemisphere.  

Connor also oversaw the 1969 and 1971 tours to South Africa.

References

 Howell, Max (2005) Born to Lead – Wallaby Test Captains, Celebrity Books, Auckland NZ

External links

1935 births
Australian expatriate sportspeople in New Zealand
Australia international rugby union players
Australia national rugby union team coaches
Australian rugby union captains
Australian rugby union coaches
Australian rugby union players
Brothers Old Boys players
Living people
New Zealand international rugby union players
New Zealand rugby union players
Rugby union scrum-halves
Rugby union players from Brisbane